Dalhart Municipal Airport  is in unincorporated Hartley County, Texas, three miles (5 km) southwest of Dalhart, Texas, a city straddling the border of Dallam and Hartley counties in the northwest corner of the Texas Panhandle.

The airport sees no airlines.

Facilities

In the year ending June 25, 2009 the airport had 22,750 aircraft operations, average 62 per day: 75% local general aviation, 25% transient general aviation, and <1% military. 30 aircraft are based at this airport: 80% single-engine, 17% multi-engine and 3% glider.

History
The airport was built by the Army and opened in May 1942 as Dalhart Army Airfield.  Initially assigned to Army Air Forces Glider command, while under construction the command's temporary headquarters operated from a tent city in Amarillo.

Dalhart AAF closed in December 1945; the property went to the city. Several remaining buildings have been used as the Dalhart municipal airport.

References

External links

1943 establishments in Texas
Airports established in 1943
Airports in Texas
Buildings and structures in Hartley County, Texas
Transportation in Hartley County, Texas